Hari Viswanath (born on 18 December) is an Indian film director, producer and screenwriter. He is an Engineer turned Filmmaker from Chennai, India. He was the Jury member of Indian Panorama section of International Film Festival of India 2017, Goa.

His passion for film making simmers by accompanying his father to his theatre performances. Being closely associated with theatre crystallized his vision and path for himself.  Inspired by real life incidents, he wrote and directed his debut short film "Idukkan" (sufferings)  which won the "Best short film award" in Norway Tamil Film Festival 2013. Ever since he has been actively directing films and writing stories close to his heart.

He made his feature film debut with Radiopetti (Radio Set) in 2015, which became the first Tamil film to win the Audience Award Best Film in the official competition in Busan International Film Festival 2015  and has been officially selected only Tamil film for Indian Panorama for 46th International Film Festival of India to be held at Panaji, Goa. It also won the 2nd Best film award and a special Jury for Best Acting award in Chennai International film festival 2015. The film also Won the "Best Music" award at ImagineIndia film festival 2016, Spain. It was officially selected in Pune International film festival 2016 and in 8th Panorama of Contemporary Indian Cinema, Auroville. His debut Hindi film Bansuri: The Flute, starring Anurag Kashyap and Rituparna Sengupta was released on 16 April 2021.

Filmography

Awards 

 Best Film (Audience Award) Busan International Film Festival 2015 )  
 Best Film (second place) Chennai International Film Festival 2015
 Best Film - Government of Puducherry State Award

References

External links 
 

Film directors from Chennai
Tamil film directors
Tamil screenwriters
Screenwriters from Tamil Nadu
Living people
Year of birth missing (living people)